Kerrygold Irish Cream Liqueur is an Irish cream, Irish whiskey, and chocolate based liqueur produced in Ireland by Kerrygold Irish Cream Liqueur Limited. It was first introduced in the US in 2014 and the trademark is owned by Kerrygold under Ornua, previously known as the Irish Dairy Board. It has a declared alcohol content of 17% alcohol by volume.  Infinium Spirits is the exclusive U.S. importer of Kerrygold Irish Cream Liqueur.

History 
In the early 2010s, the Irish Dairy Board approached the design agency Dynamo to develop and promote a cream liquor using their products. The product was intended to capitalize on Kerrygold's brand as a dairy producer and to compete with the popular Bailey's Irish Cream. The lifting of milk export quotas in Ireland also gave the company strong incentive to expand the international market for its dairy products.

In September 2014, the product launched in the United States in Florida and Illinois.

Manufacture 
Kerrygold Irish Cream Liqueur was created by Kerrygold in Ireland, under Ornua – the Home of Irish Dairy which is a Co-op owned by Ireland’s dairy processors, and in turn by Ireland’s dairy farmers. In April 2015, milk quotas were lifted in Europe.  Ornua was looking for more ways to export larger quantities of milk. The launching of the cream liqueur was one of the outcomes. Currently, the product is sold solely in the US, Dublin Airport and O'Briens Off Licence, in Douglas, Cork 

The alcohol, chocolate, and cream from grass-fed cows, together with Irish whiskey from various distilleries, are homogenized to form an emulsion with the aid of an emulsifier, casein. This process prevents separation of the alcohol and cream during storage for up to 24 months. Without the homogenization, the fat from the cream rises to the top of the product. The quantity of other ingredients is not disclosed but they include herbs, sugar, and caramel.

Storage and shelf life
Kerrygold Irish Cream Liqueurs shelf life is 2 years, stored in a refrigerator or not, but should be consumed within 6 months of opening. The product should be stored away from direct sunlight at temperatures between 0 and 25 °C (32 and 77 °F).

Drinking 
Like other Irish creams, the cream will curdle whenever it comes into contact with a weak acid. Milk and cream contain casein, which coagulates, when mixed with weak acids such as lemon, tonic water, or traces of wine. While this outcome is undesirable in most situations, some cocktails specifically encourage coagulation.

Cocktails containing Kerrygold
Kerry Berry 
White Rudolph 
Irish Cream Espressotini

Awards
Kerrygold Irish Cream Liqueur is the winner of the 2016 World Drink Awards "World's Best Cream Liqueur Award".

See also
Irish Cream
Irish Coffee
Baileys

References

External links 
 
Ornua
Terra

Cream liqueurs
Irish liqueurs
Products introduced in 2014
Irish brands